Hyalyris coeno is a species of butterfly of the family Nymphalidae. It is found in South America.

Subspecies
H. c. coeno (Venezuela)
H. c. acceptabilis (Weeks, 1902) (Bolivia)
H. c. angustior (Schaus & Cockerell, 1923) (Colombia)
H. c. atrata Fox, 1971 (Peru)
H. c. avinoffi Fox, 1971 (Venezuela)
H. c. florida (Röber, 1930) (Colombia)
H. c. norella (Hewitson, 1859) (Ecuador)
H. c. norellana (Haensch, 1903) (Ecuador)

References

Butterflies described in 1847
Ithomiini
Nymphalidae of South America